Marcos Daniel Mata (born August 1, 1986) is an Argentine professional basketball player. He is a small forward, but he can also play at the shooting guard position. He plays professionally for Club Atlético Aguada, and has also been a member of the senior men's Argentine national basketball team.

Professional career
Mata began his pro career playing in the Argentine League with Peñarol Mar del Plata.  In the 2009–10 season, he helped the team win its first ever Argentine League title, while also winning the FIBA Americas League 2009–10 season. He moved to the Spanish League club CB Sevilla before the 2013–14 season.

On July 27, 2020, Mata signed with Saga Ballooners of the Japanese B. League.

National team career
Mata is also a member of the senior men's Argentine national basketball team. He made his debut with the senior Argentina national team at the 2008 South American Championship, helping the team to a gold medal.  He later won a silver medal with the team at the 2010 South American Championship.

In 2010, Mata was named to Argentina's 2010 FIBA World Championship squad – his first major international tournament – when long-time Argentina national team player, Andrés Nocioni, withdrew from the tournament. He also played with Argentina at the 2012 Summer Olympics, and at the 2013 FIBA Americas Championship, where he won a bronze medal.

References

External links
FIBA Profile
Eurobasket.com Profile
Spanish League Profile 

1986 births
Living people
2010 FIBA World Championship players
2014 FIBA Basketball World Cup players
Argentine expatriate basketball people in Spain
Argentine men's basketball players
Basketball players at the 2012 Summer Olympics
Basketball players at the 2015 Pan American Games
Franca Basquetebol Clube players
Italian men's basketball players
Liga ACB players
Novo Basquete Brasil players
Olympic basketball players of Argentina
Pan American Games competitors for Argentina
Peñarol de Mar del Plata basketball players
Real Betis Baloncesto players
Saga Ballooners players
San Lorenzo de Almagro (basketball) players
Shooting guards
Small forwards
Sportspeople from Mar del Plata